Leroy Rountree Hassell Sr. (August 17, 1955 – February 9, 2011), was a justice of the Virginia Supreme Court and the first African-American Chief Justice of that Court, serving two four-year terms from February 1, 2003, to January 31, 2011. He was succeeded as Chief Justice by Cynthia D. Kinser.

Early and family life

In 1973, Hassell graduated from Norview High School in Norfolk, Virginia, where his classmates voted him "most likely to succeed". Hassell attended the University of Virginia for his undergraduate degree, earning a BA in 1977 (and earlier achieving the coveted distinction of residing in a room on the Lawn or original campus designed by Thomas Jefferson. Hassell then attended Harvard Law School, where he edited the Civil Rights-Civil Liberties Law Review and received his J.D. in 1980.

Career
After law school and following admission to the Virginia State Bar, Hassell worked for the Richmond branch of McGuire Woods, where he was made a partner in seven years (1987). He also served as co-counsel to the Richmond Redevelopment and Housing Authority and as chair of the Richmond School Board.

Governor Gerald Baliles appointed Hassell, although only 34 years old, to the Virginia Supreme Court in 1989, and he was seated with legislative approval. In 2002, after the legislature allowed the justices to choose their Chief Justice, his peers selected him. Hassell thus became the first African–American Chief Justice of Virginia when sworn into that office on February 1, 2003. As Chief Justice, Hassell advocated for an independent judiciary as well as greater access to legal services for all Virginians. He also established a commission to reform Virginia's outdated mental health laws.

Hassell also served as jurist-in-residence at  the Regent University School of Law, and on the school's Board of Visitors.

Death and legacy

Hassell was ill with what was ultimately diagnosed as  lymphoma during most of his final year of service as chief justice. The Virginia Bar Association honored him with its Distinguished service award in 2011. However, Hassell did not sit in his Court's final session in January 2011, and on February 9, 2011, the court announced his death.

Hassell's body lay in state February 11 in the Rotunda of the Virginia State Capitol, his casket draped with the flag of Virginia. He was the first African–American person in Virginia to be accorded that honor. He was survived by his widow, two daughters, a son, and a grandchild. He was interred on February 12, 2011, at Greenwood Memorial Gardens Cemetery following a memorial service at Faith Landmark Ministries. In 2016, the Library of Virginia and Dominion Power honored him as one of their Strong Men and Women in Virginia History.

Regent University School of Law hosts an annual moot court competition which bears Chief Justice Hassell's name in his honor. The competition's 20th anniversary takes place in October, 2020.

See also
 List of African-American jurists

Notes and references

1955 births
2011 deaths
Politicians from Norfolk, Virginia
Harvard Law School alumni
Regent University people
Virginia lawyers
African-American judges
Chief Justices of the Supreme Court of Virginia
20th-century American judges
20th-century American lawyers
McGuireWoods people
20th-century African-American people
21st-century African-American people